Aeranthes carnosa is a species of orchid native to the east coast of Madagascar.

References

carnosa
Orchids of Madagascar